is a Japanese boy band with four members from Kis-My-Ft2. Their single "" was number-one on the weekly Oricon Singles Chart.

Members

Discography

Singles

Studio albums

Filmography

Television drama
 Heisei Busaiku Salaryman (NTV, 2014–2015)

Music programs
 Utage! (TBS, 2014–2015)
 Momm!! (TBS, 2015–2017)

Commercials
 Asahi Soft Drinks "Spiral Grape" (2014)
 Kowa Company "Cabbage series" (2014–present)

Concerts

Busaiku Mura no Watto! Odoroku! Dai 1 sho was Busaiku's first concert tour. The theme was "Wa!". They performed eighteen songs and mobilized 52,465 people.

Notes

References

Japanese boy bands